The Rising Tide is a novel about issues confronting women in the years just before suffrage by the American writer Margaret Deland (1857–1945) set in the 19th century fictional locale of Mercer, an Ohio River community that represents Pittsburgh, Pennsylvania.

The novel tells the story of Frederica Payton, a "new woman" who illustrates the extremes of the feminist question.

It was first published in installments in Harper's Monthly from December 1915 through October 1916.

External links
The Rising Tide (1916) ( Internet Archive e-text)

References

1916 American novels
Novels set in Pittsburgh
Novels set in the 19th century
Novels first published in serial form
Works originally published in Harper's Magazine
Harper & Brothers books